East Bank station is a light rail station along the Green Line in Minneapolis, Minnesota, located on Washington Avenue on the East Bank campus of the University of Minnesota. It is located between Union Street and Harvard Street.  This is south of the Transportation and Safety Building and north of Moos Tower and Weaver-Densford Hall.

Washington Avenue on the East Bank was converted into a transit mall when the light-rail line was being built. Construction began in the area in May 2011, and the station opened along with the rest of the line in 2014.

References

External links
Metro Transit: East Bank Station

Metro Green Line (Minnesota) stations in Minneapolis
Railway stations in the United States opened in 2014
2014 establishments in Minnesota
Railway stations in the United States at university and college campuses